The 2015 Italian Athletics Championships was the 105th edition of the Italian Athletics Championships and were held in Turin from 24 to 26 July 2015.

Champions

References

External links 
 Italian Athletics Federation

Italian Athletics Championships
Athletics
Italian Athletics Outdoor Championships